The discography of American singer-songwriter Emily Osment consists of one studio album, one extended play, and nine singles. Osment released her debut extended play, All the Right Wrongs, on October 27, 2009 under Wind-up Records, to mixed reviews. It was preceded by the lead single "All the Way Up", which peaked at number 76 on the Canadian Hot 100. The EP spawned a second single, "You Are the Only One", but it failed to impact any charts.  
Osment released her debut album, Fight or Flight, on October 5, 2010 under Wind-up Records, to mixed reviews. It was preceded by the lead single "Let's Be Friends". The album spawned a second single, "Lovesick". Osment also released "Hush", a duet with Josh Ramsay and "Drift", from the film Cyberbully, in 2011.

Albums

Studio albums

Extended plays

Singles

As main artist

As featured artist

Promotional singles

Other appearances

Music videos

References

External links
 The official website of Emily Osment

Discographies of American artists
Pop music discographies